Elections for Ipswich Borough Council were held on 1 May 2003. One third of the council was up for election and the Labour Party kept overall control of the council.

After the election, the composition of the council was:
Labour 31
Conservative 12
Liberal Democrat 5

Election result

Ward results

Alexandra

Bixley

Bridge

Castle Hill

Gainsborough

Gipping

Holywells

Priory Heath

Rushmere

Sprites

St John's

St Margaret's

Stoke Park

Westgate

Whitehouse

Whitton

References
2003 Ipswich election result

2003 English local elections
2003
2000s in Suffolk